Monteverdi is a crater on Mercury with a diameter of 138 kilometers. Its name was adopted by the International Astronomical Union (IAU) in 1979, from the Italian composer Claudio Monteverdi, a crucial transitional figure between Renaissance and Baroque music. It is on the southern margin of Borealis Planitia, north of Rubens.

References

Impact craters on Mercury
Claudio Monteverdi